Klaas Lugthart (18 April 1928 – 9 February 2015) was a Dutch footballer. He played in two matches for the Netherlands national football team in 1952.

References

External links
 

1928 births
2015 deaths
Dutch footballers
Netherlands international footballers
Place of birth missing
Association footballers not categorized by position